The D Line is a light rail line which is part of the rail system operated by the Regional Transportation District in the Denver–Aurora Metropolitan Area in Colorado. The D line was the first line in the system when it opened in 1994, traveling from downtown Denver to I-25 and Broadway as the Central Corridor. It was extended along the Southwest Corridor in July 2000. Because it was the first and only line in the system it had no letter or color designation until the Central Platte Valley Spur opened on April 5, 2002, although on maps it was designated as Route 101.

Route 
The D Line's northern terminus is in downtown Denver, at 19th Street. On trips from Littleton, the line runs along 14th Street and California Street before reaching the northern terminus; on trips leaving downtown, the line goes along Stout Street. Then the line follows Stout Street and Colfax Avenue, and follows a railroad right-of-way, where it joins with the C Line at 10th & Osage station. They run in tandem until they reach their southern terminus at Mineral Avenue in Littleton.

The line previously went as far north as Five Points, but was truncated to downtown with the commencement of L Line service in January 2018.

Stations

FasTracks 

The 2004 voter approved FasTracks plan will add  to the Southwest Corridor (C Line and D Line).  It will also add a station with 1,000 parking spots at C-470 and Lucent Boulevard in Highlands Ranch.

References

External links 

RTD D Line Schedule

RTD light rail
Transportation in Arapahoe County, Colorado
Railway lines opened in 1994
750 V DC railway electrification